Nashan (Minaean:  romanized: , ; modern day Kharbat Al-Sawda') is the name of an ancient South Arabian city in the northern al-Jawf region of present day Yemen, in the territory of the ancient Kingdom of Ma'in. The city was called Nestum in the Natural History book that was written by Pliny the Elder.

History
Nashan, located near "Al-Khārid river" along with the neighboring Kaminahu, Haram and Nashaq in the region of al-Jawf, was a separate city state. 

Around 715 BC, it was initially annexed by Yitha'amar Watar I of Saba. Subsequently, Karib'il Watar (around 685 BC) launched a campaign to capture Nashan and Nashaq which lasted for three years. Eventually, he managed to subdue both cities, and to dedicate his triumph to his god Almaqah.

A stela of Yatha' Amar Watar dated to about 715BC, tells that he invaded the area and took the town. It reads: Yatha amar Watar son of Yakrubmalik mukarrib of Saba dedicated to Aranyada' the patron  when Aranyada came back from the territories of Aranyada' and of Nashshan and avenged Nashshan at the expense of Kaminahu because Nashahn had maintained the alliance of Almaqah  and of Aranyada', of Yatha amar and of Malikwaqah, of Saba of nashshan, because of ... of god and parton of pact and alliance. 

In 25 BC, Nashan was mentioned as "Annestum" during Aelius Gallus's expedition to Arabia Felix under orders of Augustus against Saba'. However, the expedition ended in critical failure and the Romans accused a Nabataean guide called "Syllaeus" of misleading them. This expedition was mentioned by Greek geographer Strabo in which he named Ilasaros as the ruler of Hadhramaut at that time.

Culture
Nashshān, was in Wādī Madhāb, to the north-east of Ma'rib and was a trading center and town in Pre-Islamic Arabia. Nashshān, and its neighbours, Haram (Yemen), Kaminahu and  Inabba' were similar in that they were civil temple settlements and city states, and inscriptions in all four towns are in the Minaean language.

External links 
 Archive for the study of ancient south Arabian inscriptions in Kharibat as-Sawda

Notes

References

Archaeological sites in Yemen
City-states